The Wych Elm cultivar Ulmus glabra 'Horizontalis', commonly known as the Weeping Wych Elm or Horizontal Elm, was discovered in a Perth nursery circa 1816. The tree was originally identified as 'Pendula' by Loddiges (London), in his catalogue of 1836, a name adopted by Loudon two years later in Arboretum et Fruticetum Britannicum, 3: 1398, 1838, but later sunk as a synonym for 'Horizontalis'.

Description
'Horizontalis' has branches that extend out horizontally with weeping branchlets. It is usually grafted onto a tall understock of Ulmus glabra to effectively display its weeping habit. The tree can eventually grow to a height of 20 metres with a similar spread. It can be distinguished from the related Camperdown Elm by its more spreading and flattened canopy and much larger mature size, although its shape does vary widely, as noted by Loudon: "A beautiful...tree generally growing to one side, spreading its branches out in a fan-like manner...sometimes horizontally and at other times almost perpendicularly downwards so that the head of the tree exhibits great variety of shape".

Pests and diseases
'Horizontalis' is not known to be any less susceptible to Dutch elm disease than the species.

Cultivation
The cultivar was found in a bed of seedling in the Perth Nursery, the plant was purchased by Booth of Hamburg, Germany, who then distributed it. Specimens supplied by the Späth nursery to the Royal Botanic Garden Edinburgh in 1902 as U. montana 'Horizontalis' may survive in Edinburgh as it was the practice of the Garden to distribute trees about the city (viz. the Wentworth Elm); the current list of Living Accessions held in the Garden per se does not list the plant.

'Horizontalis' was also known to have been marketed in Poland in the 19th century by the Ulrich nursery. Warsaw.

Notable trees

Synonymy
'Tabletop Elm': Anon.
Ulmus glabra 'Pendula' Anon. 
Ulmus montana (: glabra) var. decumbens: Masters, Hortus Duroverni, 67, 1831, name in synonymy.  
Ulmus montana (: glabra) var. pendula. Loddiges, (Hackney, London), Catalogue 1836, and Loudon, Arboretum et Fruticetum Britannicum, 3: 1398, 1838, also by Krüssmann in Parey Blumengartn. ed. 2, 1: 519, 1958, as a cultivar.
Ulmus montana (: glabra) 'Parasol': Koch, Dendrologie; Bäume, Sträucher und Halbsträucher, welche in Mittel- und Nord- Europa im Freien kultivirt werden 2 (1): 417, 1872, name in synonymy.
Ulmus pendulina: Sinclair, in Donn, Hortus Cantabrigensis ed. 12. 110, 1831, but without description.

Varieties
A variegated sport of 'Horizontalis', 'Pendula Variegata', was in cultivation in the 19th and early 20th centuries.

Accessions
North America
Dawes Arboretum , Newark, Ohio, US. 2 trees, no acc. details available.
Holden Arboretum, US. Acc. no. 55-1033 (as U. glabra 'Pendula').
Morris Arboretum , University of Pennsylvania, US. Acc. no. 56-239-A

Europe
Arboretum de La Petite Loiterie , Monthodon, France. No details available
Brighton & Hove City Council, UK. NCCPG Elm Collection. Several trees, largest in Royal Pavilion Grounds.
Dubrava Arboretum, Lithuania. No details available.
Hortus Botanicus Nationalis, Salaspils, Latvia. Acc. nos. 18112, 18113, (as U. glabra 'Pendula').
Linnaean Gardens of Uppsala, Finland. Acc. nos. 1976-1051, 1974-1111, 1977-1092 (as forma pendula, and 'Pendula' resp.). 
Sir Harold Hillier Gardens, Ampfield, Hampshire, UK; acc. no. 1977.5056
Strona Arboretum Ulmus lamellosa, University of Life Sciences, Warsaw, Poland. Listed as Ulmus glabra 'Pendula'
Tallinn Botanic Garden, Estonia . Listed as 'Pendula'; no accession details available.
University of Copenhagen, Denmark. Listed as Ulmus glabra 'Pendula'; no accession details available.

Australasia
Ballarat Botanical Gardens, Australia. One tree listed on the Significant Tree Register of the National Trust.
Eastwoodhill Arboretum , Gisborne, New Zealand. 2 trees, details not known.
Hascombe, Mount Macedon, Australia. 100 years old (2009).

Nurseries

Europe
Arboretum Waasland , Nieuwkerken-Waas, Belgium, (as U. glabra 'Pendula').
Boomwekerijen 'De Batterijen', Ochten, Netherlands  (as Ulmus glabra Pendula)
Dulford Nurseries, Cullompton, Devon, UK  (as Ulmus glabra 'Pendula')
UmbraFlor , Spello, Italy (as Ulmus montana 'Pendula')
Westerveld Boomkwekerij B.V., Opheusden, The Netherlands (as Ulmus glabra 'Pendula').

Australasia
Established Tree Transplanters Pty. Ltd., Wandin, Victoria, Australia.

References

External links
  Sheet described as U. montana horizontalis; RBGE specimen from Späth nursery, 1902 
  Sheet described as U. montana horizontalis; RBGE specimen from Späth nursery, 1902 

Wych elm cultivar
Ulmus articles with images
Ulmus